Pedro Cristóvão (born 4 June 1965) is a Portuguese judoka. He competed at the 1988 Summer Olympics and the 1992 Summer Olympics.

References

1965 births
Living people
Portuguese male judoka
Olympic judoka of Portugal
Judoka at the 1988 Summer Olympics
Judoka at the 1992 Summer Olympics
Sportspeople from Lisbon
20th-century Portuguese people